Colossendeis proboscidea is a species of sea spider native to the Arctic and northeast Atlantic.

References

Pycnogonids